Alexander Longmore (died 27 October 1851) was an Australian politician. He was a barrister who was appointed to the New South Wales Legislative Council on 13 October 1851, but he died fifteen days later.

References

Year of birth unknown
1851 deaths
Members of the New South Wales Legislative Council